"Every Day (I Love You More)" is a 1989 song recorded by Australian singer Jason Donovan. It was released on 28 August 1989 as the fifth and final single from his debut album, Ten Good Reasons. It was also the least successful release from this album, remaining at the bottom of many European charts; although it hit number two in the UK for a week, it was the same week that the Italo house song "Ride on Time" by Black Box had its second of six consecutive weeks at number one. As with Donovan's other songs at the time, it was written and produced by Stock Aitken Waterman.

Track listings
 7" single
 "Every Day (I Love You More)" — 3:24
 "I Guess She Never Loved Me" — 3:30

 12" maxi
 "Every Day (I Love You More)" — 5:42
 "I Guess She Never Loved Me" — 3:30
 "Every Day (I Love You More)" (7" version) — 3:23

 Cassette Single
 "Every Day (I Love You More)" — 3:24
 "I Guess She Never Loved Me" — 3:30

 CD maxi
 "Every Day (I Love You More)" (7" version) — 3:24
 "Every Day (I Love You More)" (12" version) — 5:42
 "I Guess She Never Loved Me" — 3:30

Credits
 Backing vocals : Mae McKenna, Mike Stock and Miriam Stockley
 Engineer : Karen Hewitt and Yoyo
 Guitars : Matt Aitken
 Keyboards : Matt Aitken and Mike Stock
 Mixed by Pete Hammond
 Producer : Stock, Aitken and Waterman
 Design : David Howells
 Hair : Lino Carbosiero
 Photography : Simon Fowler (photographer)

Charts

Weekly charts

Year-end charts

References

1989 singles
Jason Donovan songs
Song recordings produced by Stock Aitken Waterman
Dance-pop songs
Songs written by Pete Waterman
Songs written by Matt Aitken
Songs written by Mike Stock (musician)
1989 songs
Pete Waterman Entertainment singles
Irish Singles Chart number-one singles